There is the homophone name John Gray.  John Grey may refer to:

People

14th, 15th, and 16th centuries
Sir John de Grey (died 1266), English soldier and high sheriff. 
Sir John de Grey, 1st Baron Grey de Rotherfield (c.1300–1359), founding member and 14th Knight of the Order of the Garter in 1348
John de Grey, 2nd Baron Grey of Rotherfield (1320–1375), 2nd Baron Grey of Rotherfield
John Grey (MP for Bedford), MP for Bedford 1406
John Grey (Devon MP) (died 1413), MP for Totnes, Exeter and Barnstaple
John Grey, 1st Earl of Tankerville (1384–1421), 1st Earl of Tankerville
John Grey, 2nd Baron Grey de Wilton (died 1323), English peer and Parliamentarian
John Grey, 8th Baron Grey de Wilton (died 1498), 8th Baron Grey de Wilton
John Grey (knight) (c. 1387–1439), English soldier of the Hundred Years' War
John Grey of Groby (c. 1432–1461), first husband of Queen Elizabeth Woodville
John Grey, 2nd Viscount Lisle (1480–1504), British peer
Lord John Grey (Tudor nobleman) (1523/24–1564)
John Grey (died 1594), MP for Staffordshire

18th, 19th, and 20th centuries
John Grey (Staffordshire MP) (died 1709), Staffordshire politician
John Grey (British Army officer, died 1760)
John Grey (MP for Bridgnorth) (c. 1724–1777), British politician and Clerk of the Green Cloth
John Grey (British Army officer, died 1856), former Commander-in-Chief of the Bombay Army
John Grey (land agent) (1785–1868), English land agent and agriculturist
John Grey (1815–1875), accepted alternate spelling of John Gray (Irish politician)
John Grey (screenwriter) (1873–1933), American screenwriter
John Grey (Australian general) (born 1939), Lieutenant General, Chief of Army (Australia) 1992–1995
Johnny Grey (born 1951), British designer of kitchens
John Grey, singer on !Hero

Characters
 Mr John Grey, a character in Anthony Trollope's mid-1860s novel Can You Forgive Her
Dr. John Grey (comics), a character in X-Men, father of superhero Jean Grey
Lord John Grey (character), a character from  Diana Gabaldon's Outlander series

Other
John Grey & Sons, a manufacturer of musical instruments
John Grey, a barque wrecked in Mount's Bay in 1867
"Johnny Grey", a song by Eiffel 65 from their album Contact!

See also
John Gray (disambiguation)
Jonathan Gray (disambiguation)